Saint-Jean-du-Castillonnais is a commune in the Ariège department in southwestern France.

Population

Inhabitants are called Saint-Jeantois.

See also
Communes of the Ariège department

References

Communes of Ariège (department)
Ariège communes articles needing translation from French Wikipedia